Serena Lucha Gonzales-Gutierrez (born November 22, 1981) is an American politician who is the member of the Colorado House of Representatives from the 4th district in Denver.

Elections

2018
Gonzales-Gutierrez was elected in the general election on November 6, 2018, winning 82 percent of the vote over 18 percent of Republican candidate Robert John.

2020
Gonzales-Gutierrez ran unopposed in the Democratic primary. In the general election, she garnered 81.8% of the vote, defeating Republican nominee Grant Price.

References

Gonzales-Gutierrez, Serena
Living people
21st-century American politicians
21st-century American women politicians
Women state legislators in Colorado
1981 births
Hispanic and Latino American state legislators in Colorado
Hispanic and Latino American women in politics